This is a list of notable people who served as ambulance drivers during the First World War. A remarkable number—writers especially—volunteered as ambulance drivers for the Allied Powers. In many cases, they sympathized strongly with the ideals of the Allied Powers, but did not want, or were too young or old, to participate in a combat role. For women, combat was not an option at the time. Several of the Americans on the list volunteered before the United States' 1917 entry into the war. Many of the American writers would later be associated with the Lost Generation.

Businessmen
Tony Hulman – American businessman, owner and operator of Indianapolis Motor Speedway, and volunteer with the American Red Cross Motor Corps
Ray Kroc – American entrepreneur of McDonald's Corporation fame – trained to become an ambulance driver, though the war ended before he saw action

Composers
Maurice Ravel – volunteer ambulance driver or truck driver
Albert Roussel – Red Cross transport driver
Ralph Vaughan Williams – Royal Army Medical Corps

Filmmakers
Julien Bryan – combat photographer, filmmaker and documentarian who volunteered with the American Field Service for the French Army in World War I, driving an ambulance in Verdun and the Argonne, and subsequently wrote a book Ambulance 464 about his experience illustrated with his photographs.
René Clair – served as an ambulance driver in WWI before being invalided out for a spinal injury. Clair was deeply affected by the horrors of war that he witnessed and gave expression to this in writing a volume of poetry entitled La Tête de l'homme, which remains unpublished.
Jean Cocteau – served in WWI with the Red Cross as an ambulance driver
Walt Disney – volunteer American Red Cross Motor Corps, but served after the armistice ending World War I was signed
William A. Wellman – served as a driver with the American Volunteer Motor Ambulance Corps (a.k.a. Norton-Harjes Ambulance Corps) in Europe. While in Paris, Wellman enlisted in the French Foreign Legion to serve as a fighter pilot becoming the first American to join Escadrille N.87 of the Lafayette Flying Corps.

Writers
Robert C. Binkley – volunteer United States Army Ambulance Service
Robert Sidney Bowen – volunteer American Field Service in France, also served as a fighter pilot in both the Royal Air Force (RAF) and the U.S. Army Air Service during the war
Louis Bromfield – volunteer American Field Service
William Slater Brown – volunteer Norton-Harjes Ambulance Corps
Malcolm Cowley – volunteer American Field Service
Harry Crosby – volunteer American Field Service
E.E. Cummings – volunteer Norton-Harjes Ambulance Corps
Kati Dadeshkeliani – Russian Army ambulance driver
Russell Davenport – U.S. Army Medical Corps
John Dos Passos – volunteer Norton-Harjes Ambulance Corps
Dale Van Every – volunteer, United States Army Ambulance Service
Julien Green- volunteer American Field Service
Dashiell Hammett – U.S. Army ambulance driver who was attached to the Norton-Harjes Ambulance Corps and was subsequently afflicted with the Spanish flu
Ernest Hemingway – volunteer Red Cross Motor Corps in Italy
Robert Hillyer – volunteer Norton-Harjes Ambulance Corps
Sidney Howard – volunteer American Field Service
Jerome K. Jerome – French Army ambulance driver
John Howard Lawson – volunteer Norton-Harjes Ambulance Corps
Desmond MacCarthy – volunteer British Red Cross ambulance corps
Archibald MacLeish – U.S. Army ambulance driver, who later became an artillery captain
John Masefield – served as hospital orderly in British hospital for French soldiers in France
F. Van Wyck Mason – ambulance corps volunteer, who later joined the French Army and then the U.S. Army; grandfather Frank H. Mason was Chairman of the Ambulance Committee of the American Hospital in Paris
Somerset Maugham – volunteer British Red Cross ambulance corps
Charles Nordhoff – volunteer American Field Service
William Seabrook – American Field Service
Robert W. Service – British Red Cross volunteer
Olaf Stapledon – Friends' Ambulance Unit volunteer
 Gertrude Stein – volunteer in France
Hugh Walpole – Red Cross volunteer in Russia
Amos Niven Wilder – American Field Service volunteer, later joined an artillery unit

Other notable people
A. Piatt Andrew – American economist and politician who served as Assistant Secretary of the Treasury, who was the founder and director of the American Ambulance Field Service during World War I
Brooks Benedict – American actor of the silent and sound film eras who served with the American Ambulance Corps and in the U.S. Army Air Service during the First World War
Frank Buckles – last American World War I veteran 
Marion Barbara "Joe" Carstairs – wealthy British power boat racer known for her speed and her eccentric lifestyle
Stafford Cripps – British politician
Hélène Dutrieu – pioneering French aviator
Florence Jaffray Harriman – socialite and member of Wilson's commission on labor unrest, director of the American Red Cross Women's Motor Corps in France, and organizer of the Women's Motor Corps of the District of Columbia
Pyotr Kapitsa - Russian (later Soviet) physicist, served on the Polish front
Rotha Lintorn-Orman - British fascist
Cathleen Mann – British artist
Olive Mudie-Cooke – British artist
Waldo Peirce – American painter, volunteer American Field Service
Alice B. Toklas – American member of the Parisian avant-garde of the early 20th century, and the life partner of Gertrude Stein
Percy Toplis – notorious British deserter
Harcourt Williams – English actor and director who served with the Friends' Ambulance Unit

People who served the Allies in a related capacity
Algernon Blackwood – British Red Cross Searcher, trying to identify dead or lost soldiers, British author
A.J. Cronin – Royal Navy surgeon, Scottish novelist
Fr. Teilhard de Chardin, SJ – French stretcher bearer, Jesuit priest, paleontologist, geologist, theologian, author 
Fr. Angelo Giuseppe Roncalli – stretcher carrier and chaplain in Italian Army, later elected Pope John XXIII
Marjory Stoneman Douglas – American Red Cross volunteer, eminent American conservationist
Dorothy Canfield Fisher – volunteered to help blinded Allied soldiers, American social activist and author
E.M. Forster – interviewed wounded in Egyptian hospitals, English novelist
Peter Grant – volunteer driver/mechanic
Anne Green – volunteer work, author and translator, sister of aforementioned ambulance driver and author Julian Green
Frederick Leney – British Red Cross Searcher, 1914–1916
Alexander H. Rice, Jr. – volunteer physician, explorer in South America
Gertrude Stein – volunteer driver for French hospitals, American poet, playwright, feminist
Edmund Wilson – American literary critic

Ambulance drivers who served in other conflicts
Patrick Barr – English actor who served with the Friends' Ambulance Unit in Africa during World War II. Barr also helped to rescue people in the Blitz in London's East End.
Jean Batten – pioneering New Zealand aviator who made a number of record-breaking solo flights across the world, including the first solo flight from England to New Zealand in 1936. After she unsuccessfully applied to serve with the Air Transport Auxiliary during the Second World War, Batten joined the short-lived Anglo-French Ambulance Corps before it was disbanded when Germany conquered France.
John Boulting – British filmmaker who served as an ambulance driver with the Spanish Medical Aid Committee during the Spanish Civil War and later as an officer in the Royal Air Force during the World War II.
Charles Fernley Fawcett – actor, filmmaker and professional wrestler who served in both Section Volontaire des Américains of the French Ambulance Corps and the American Ambulance Corps during WWII. Also during the war, Fawcett served in the Polish Army, helped Holocaust survivors escape while serving as a secret agent with the French Resistance, served in the Royal Air Force as a fighter pilot, and fought with the French Foreign Legion. Before the war, he served in the U.S. Merchant Marine. After WWII, he fought against the Communists in the Greek Civil War and later co-founded the International Medical Corps, a humanitarian aid organization that provides emergency medical services, healthcare training and capacity building to those affected by disaster, disease or conflict.
Mahatma Gandhi – created the Indian Ambulance Corps for use by the British as stretcher bearers during the Second Boer War (1899–1902). The famed Indian lawyer and political ethicist also led the Corps during the Zulu rebellion in South Africa in 1906.
Robert Montgomery – Academy Award-nominated actor who drove ambulances with the American Field Service in France during World War II until the Dunkirk evacuation. He later served as a lieutenant commander in the U.S. Navy and was decorated for bravery in combat during the Battle of Normandy.
Patrick O'Brian – English author of Master and Commander who served as an ambulance driver during the Blitz in WWII. O'Brian also served in the Royal Air Force prior to the war.
Robert Whitehead – Canadian theatre producer who served as an ambulance driver in North Africa and Italy during WWII.

References

Ambulance drivers
Military medicine in World War I
Ambulance drivers during World War I